The term Open conference (or "openconference") is a derivative of the adjective "opensource", and its meaning is similarly based on the ideas of public access and community development found in the open source culture and OpenCourseWare movements.  "Conference" in this sense is used to indicate an academic or professional gathering of practitioners in a given field to present and discuss current thought, research, and practice.

An open conference is a conference that is open to the general public (usually at no cost) and encourages or requires participants to relax or eliminate intellectual property restrictions on ideas generated and presentations delivered during the conference.  Presenters often make presentations and materials available to the public for free access and use, for example through the use of a Creative Commons non-commercial attribution license.

Open conference organizers seek to open access to the conference for attendees by elimination of cost (relying on community support and sponsorships), they also provide community access to archived presentations and discussions through similar licensing agreements.

Additionally, attendees are encouraged to become participants in a collaborative community that supports and grows the conference—even to derive new  open conferences.

Conference